Division No. 1, Subdivision O is an unorganized subdivision on the Avalon Peninsula in Newfoundland and Labrador, Canada, in Division 1. It's divided into two parts, the northern portion touches Conception Bay. It includes the unincorporated communities of Marysvale and Salmonier Line.

Marysvale

Marysvale is a settlement in Newfoundland and Labrador.

Prior to about 1900 the community of Marysvale was known as Turk's Gut.  Somewhat later the nearby community of English Cove (sometimes mistakenly called English Harbour) also became part of Marysvale.

Newfoundland and Labrador subdivisions